Neochera marmorea is a moth in the family Erebidae. It is found in Indonesia, Malaysia, the Philippines, Sikkim and China (Yunnan)

The wingspan is 66–75 mm.

Subspecies
Neochera marmorea bhawana (Indonesia, Malaysia, Philippines, Sikkim)
Neochera marmorea marmorea (China, India, Philippines)

External links
 The Moths of Borneo
 marmorea marmorea info

Aganainae
Moths described in 1856